Kazakhstan made their début in the Bala Turkvision Song Contest at the 2015 festival, in Turkey. Kazakhstan held an open selection for the 2015 contest, a total of 16 artists were selected to take part in the semi-final on 19 September 2015 of which 8 will qualified to the final on 20 September 2015. The winner was decided by SMS voting. Songs must be in the national language Kazakh or Russian and artist must be aged between 8 and 13.

Before Bala Turkvision

Semi final
Table key
 Participants who qualified to the final via jury and televoting.
Semi-final

Final
Table key
 Winner of the national selection.

References

Bala
Bala Turkvision Song Contest